Roslyn McLeod (born 17 August 1976) is a Canadian rower. She competed in the women's eight event at the 2004 Summer Olympics.

References

External links
 

1976 births
Living people
Canadian female rowers
Olympic rowers of Canada
Rowers at the 2004 Summer Olympics
Rowers from Toronto
Sportspeople from North York